Thiodia torridana is a species of moth of the family Tortricidae. It is found in France, Germany, Austria, Switzerland, Italy, the Czech Republic, Slovakia, Slovenia, Hungary, Romania, Poland, Ukraine, Russia (southern Siberia, Amur-Zeya, Priamure, southern Primorsk, southern Sakhalin, Kuril Islands), Transcaucasia, Asia Minor, Kazakhstan, Turkmenistan and Kyrgyzstan.

The wingspan is 16–20 mm. Adults have been recorded on wing in June.

The larvae feed on Aster amellus, Succisa pratensis, Gnaphalium and Hieracium species. On Aster amellus, they mine the leaves. The mine has the form of a full depth broad corridor or elongate blotch. Most frass is concentrated in the first part of the mine and along the sides. The species overwinters in the mine. After hibernation, the larva leaves the mine and spins together some leaves from which it continues feeding. Larvae can be found from September to May.

References

Moths described in 1859
Eucosmini